Monroe is a British medical drama television series created and written by Peter Bowker and produced by Mammoth Screen for the ITV network. The series follows a neurosurgeon named Gabriel Monroe, played by James Nesbitt. The six-part series was commissioned by ITV as one of a number of replacements for its long-running police drama series The Bill, which was cancelled in 2010. Filming on Monroe began in Leeds in September 2010, with production based in the old Leeds Girls' High School in Headingley. The first episode was broadcast on ITV on 10 March 2011 to strong ratings. A second series followed in 2012. On 14 November 2012, it was announced that ITV had cancelled Monroe due to low viewing figures.

Development 
Screenwriter Peter Bowker announced to the trade magazine Broadcast in July 2009 that he was developing a "big medical drama" for ITV. Bowker had worked on medical dramas early in his career, including Casualty and Medics. ITV's director of drama Laura Mackie told The Stage that the series would be "grown-up" and would be based around a single character, like ITV's Doc Martin. Mackie believed that other broadcasters were reluctant to create series with one lead character—instead making ensemble shows like Casualty and Holby City—so Bowker's series would not overlap with anything already being screened.

Bowker told the Media Guardian that he had been inspired to create a series about a neurologist after his four-year-old daughter was diagnosed with a benign brain tumour. He wanted the drama of Monroe to be similar to the American medical series House; "It may be foolish to compare the two but with neurologists, as with House, there is this very intense 10 days when you work with them on a case and then you say goodbye – it is really quite fascinating and will hopefully make great drama." Independent production company Mammoth Screen developed the series with Bowker, having previously worked with him on his Wuthering Heights adaptation. The drama entered the pre-production stage in March 2010, when Laura Mackie and ITV's director of television Peter Fincham commissioned it for the network. Formal greenlighting was expected to happen in the first week of April 2010.

Film director Paul McGuigan signed on as lead director of Monroe. McGuigan researched the nature of the series by meeting with neurosurgeons and watching a brain operation being performed. Steve Lawes, with whom McGuigan worked on his other television series, Sherlock, was originally announced as the director of photography. McGuigan directed the first three episodes of the series, and David Moore directed the last three. The cast and crew met for a script read-through the week before filming began and the principal cast attended a "boot camp" at Leeds General Infirmary.

Production 
Filming on the series commenced on 26 September 2010. The principal setting of St Matthews Hospital has been created within the former Leeds Girls' High School. Eight weeks were spent converting the school into the hospital set, with the ward set built in the old library.

Characters 
James Nesbitt as Dr Gabriel Monroe. Brilliant but unusual neurosurgeon. Recently divorced from Anna, with a son Nick in university.
Sarah Parish as Dr Jenny Bremner. Talented, but somewhat aloof cardiothoracic surgeon, in a relationship with Dr Shepherd and at the start of season 2 has just returned from maternity leave.
Tom Riley as Dr Lawrence Shepherd. An anaesthetist, he is Monroe's best friend and is in a relationship with Dr Bremner, and has a baby Louis with her.
Neil Pearson as Dr Alistair Gillespie. General surgeon and newly appointed Head of Clinical Services at St Matthew's.
Manjinder Virk as Dr Sally Fortune. Neurosurgical Registrar working under Dr Monroe.
Luke Allen-Gale as Dr Daniel Springer. An over-enthusiastic neurosurgical trainee. He is often seen as obnoxious and arrogant but charming.
Michelle Asante as Dr Kitty Wilson. Neurosurgical trainee, she is shy and weak-stomached, and initially had difficulty making it through operations, Monroe however sees her potential.
Christina Chong as Dr Sarah Witney. Cardiothoracic Registrar working under Dr Bremner.
Andrew Gower as Dr Andrew Mullery. Initially a cardiothoracic surgical trainee, he is now a registrar under Gillespie specialising in general and vascular surgery.
Tracy-Ann Oberman as Lizzie Clapham. Clinical Nurse Specialist dealing with neurosurgical and cardiothoracic patients' emotional needs.
Lisa Millet as Jill McHeath. Ward Nurse, Cottingley Ward.
Thomas Morrison as Lee Bradley. Hospital Porter, also an unofficial bookie, poker enthusiast and lover of greyhounds. He regularly entertains Monroe and Shepherd with his philosophy on life.
Susan Lynch as Anna Monroe. Monroe's ex-wife.
Perry Millward as Nick Monroe. Monroe's son.
Andrew Munroe as Marlon Brown. Monroe's High School friend.

Casting 

Actor James Nesbitt, who starred in Bowker's Iraq War drama Occupation, told the Radio Times in May 2010 that he had been cast in the series. The ITV Press Centre confirmed Nesbitt's involvement on the same day the magazine was published, and announced that he would be playing the title role and that the series would commence filming in Leeds in September 2010 for broadcast in 2011. To research the role, Nesbitt watched surgery being performed and consulted neurosurgeon Philip Van Hille. Nesbitt said of Van Hille's advice, "It's been extremely important as I knew nothing about it [neurosurgery]. He taught me technique, but most of all he taught me about the relationship with patients." Monroe is described by ITV as "a brilliant and unusual neurosurgeon – a flawed genius who never lets anyone forget his flaws or his genius."

ITV's Autumn/Winter 2010 press pack refers to other characters in the series: "[Monroe's] trainees, his anaesthetist, his poker school – and his female colleague, heart surgeon Jenny Bremner, who has contempt for his cockiness." While appearing on This Morning to promote his role in Mammoth Screen's Bouquet of Barbed Wire, actor Tom Riley announced that he would be playing Monroe's anaethestist. To research the role, he met with anaesthetists in Leeds shortly before filming began, and watched brain surgery being performed on 20 September. Riley revealed the name of the character as Laurence Shepherd on Twitter.

The ITV Press Centre announced on 23 September the further casting of Sarah Parish as Jenny Bremner, Manjinder Virk as registrar Sally Fortune, Susan Lynch as Monroe's wife Anna, and Luke Allen-Gale and Michelle Asante as Daniel Springer and Kitty Wilson, two of Monroe's trainees. Liz Hume-Dawson plays theatre nurse Wicken in at least four episodes. Hume-Dawson has previously portrayed medical professionals in such productions as Bodies. Andrew Gower, a Spotlight Prize winner, plays regular character Dr Mullery, in his first professional role.

Broadcast 
Episode 1 of Monroe was broadcast on 10 March 2011 at 9 pm then each of the remaining 5 were shown weekly until 14 April 2011.

ITV commissioned a second series from Mammoth Screen in July 2011, to begin production in 2012. It screened in October and November 2012.

Episodes

Series 1 (2011)

Series 2 (2012)
Series 2 begins on Monday 1 October 2012

Notes

References

External links

2010s British drama television series
2011 British television series debuts
2012 British television series endings
2010s British medical television series
ITV television dramas
English-language television shows
Television series by Mammoth Screen
Television shows set in Leeds